Fenske is a surname. Notable people with the surname include:

Dieter Fenske (born 1942), German inorganic chemist
Doug Fenske (born 1982), American record producer, recording engineer, mix engineer, and remixer
Jacquie Fenske (born 1955 or 1956), Canadian politician
Raja Fenske (born 1988), American actor